Ettal is a German municipality in the district of Garmisch-Partenkirchen, in Bavaria.

Geography
Ettal is situated in the Oberland area in the Graswangtal between the Loisachtal and Ammertal, approx. 10 km north of Garmisch-Partenkirchen, the district capital, and approx. 4 km southwest of Oberammergau.

Division of the town

The town consists of 5 districts
 Ettal
 Graswang
 Linderhof
 Dickelschwaig
 Rahm

See also
 Ettal Abbey

References

External links
 Official site 

Garmisch-Partenkirchen (district)